Brett Young (April 3, 1967 – March 3, 2015) was an American football defensive back who played seven seasons in the Canadian Football League (CFL) with the Ottawa Rough Riders, BC Lions and Hamilton Tiger-Cats. He was drafted by the Buffalo Bills of the National Football League (NFL) in the eighth round of the 1989 NFL Supplemental Draft. He played college football at the University of Oregon and attended Phineas Banning High School in Los Angeles, California.

College career
Young played for the Oregon Ducks from 1985 to 1988, recording nine interceptions. He was dismissed from the school for academic shortcomings in June 1989.

Professional career
Young was selected by the Buffalo Bills of the NFL in the eighth round of the 1989 NFL Supplemental Draft.

Ottawa Rough Riders
On August 15, 1989, Young was signed to the practice roster of the Ottawa Rough Riders of the CFL. Due to injuries, he made his CFL debut, and first start, on August 21, 1989, against the Toronto Argonauts. He played in 24 games for the team from 1989 to 1990.

BC Lions
Young was traded to the BC Lions in 1992 for future considerations, which was later the rights to Bruce Beaton. He played in eleven games for the Lions in 1992.

Ottawa Rough Riders
Young returned to the Rough Riders late in the 1992 season and played in one game. He then played for the Rough Riders from 1993 to 1995, being named Ottawa's outstanding defensive player and earning CFL Northern All-Star honors in 1995.

Hamilton Tiger-Cats
Young was traded to the Hamilton Tiger-Cats with Horace Brooks and Jason Phillips for quarterback Steve Taylor in 1996. He played in twelve games for the Tiger-Cats during the 1996 season.

Death
Young died of kidney failure on March 3, 2015, in Torrance, California.

References

External links
Just Sports Stats

1967 births
2015 deaths
Players of American football from California
Sportspeople from Los Angeles County, California
American football defensive backs
Canadian football defensive backs
African-American players of American football
African-American players of Canadian football
Oregon Ducks football players
Ottawa Rough Riders players
BC Lions players
Hamilton Tiger-Cats players
People from Carson, California
20th-century African-American sportspeople
21st-century African-American people
Deaths from kidney failure